Ljubično is a settlement in the Municipality of Poljčane in northeastern Slovenia. It lies at the western foothills of Mount Boč, above the right bank of the Dravinja River. The area is part of the traditional region of Styria. It is now included with the rest of the municipality in the Drava Statistical Region.

References

External links
 
Ljubično on Geopedia

Populated places in the Municipality of Poljčane